The 511 Building is a building in southwest Portland, Oregon. The 14-floor structure was completed in 1956.

External links
 511 Building at Emporis

1956 establishments in Oregon
Buildings and structures completed in 1956
Buildings and structures in Portland, Oregon
Southwest Portland, Oregon